Polycarboxylates are linear polymers with a high molecular mass (Mr ≤ 100 000) and with many carboxylate groups. They are polymers of acrylic acid or copolymers of acrylic acid and maleic acid. The polymer is used as the sodium salt (see: sodium polyacrylate).

Use 

Polycarboxylates are used as builders in detergents. Their high chelating power, even at low concentrations, reduces deposits on the laundry and inhibits the crystal growth of calcite.

Polycarboxylate ethers (PCE) are used as superplasticizers in concrete production.

Safety 
Polycarboxylates are poorly biodegradable but have a low ecotoxicity. In the sewage treatment plant, the polymer remains largely in the sludge and is separated from the wastewater.

Polyamino acids like polyaspartic acid and polyglutamic acid have better biodegradability but lower chelating performance than polyacrylates. They are also less stable towards heat and alkali. Since they contain nitrogen, they contribute to eutrophication.

References 

Polymers
Salts and esters of carboxylic acids